Victor Boniface Okoh (born 23 December 2000) is a Nigerian professional footballer who plays as a forward for Belgian Pro League side Union SG.

Career
Boniface signed for Glimt from Real Sapphire on 4 March 2019. He suffered a ligament injury only two weeks after signing for Glimt, which was said to be likely to keep him on the sidelines for the duration of the 2019 season. Boniface was selected to the Nigeria U-20 squad to play the 2019 Africa U-20 Cup of Nations, but had to withdraw from the squad due to injury. In September 2019 he nonetheless made his league debut for Bodø/Glimt.

On 8 August 2022, Boniface signed a four-year contract with Union SG in Belgium.

Career statistics

Club

Honours
Bodø/Glimt
Eliteserien: 2020, 2021

References

External links
 Profile at glimt.no

2000 births
Living people
Nigerian footballers
Association football forwards
Nigeria under-20 international footballers
Real Sapphire F.C. players
FK Bodø/Glimt players
Royale Union Saint-Gilloise players
Eliteserien players
Belgian Pro League players
Nigerian expatriate footballers
Nigerian expatriate sportspeople in Norway
Expatriate footballers in Norway
Nigerian expatriate sportspeople in Belgium
Expatriate footballers in Belgium